Mohamed El-Tayar (born 7 April 1996) is an Egyptian handball player for Al Ahly and the Egyptian national team.

He studies Energy and renewable energy at Faculty of engineering Ain Shams University.

He represented Egypt at the World Men's Handball Championship in 2019, and 2021.

References

1996 births
Living people
Egyptian male handball players
Ain Shams University alumni
Olympic handball players of Egypt
Handball players at the 2020 Summer Olympics
Competitors at the 2022 Mediterranean Games
Mediterranean Games silver medalists for Egypt
Mediterranean Games medalists in handball
21st-century Egyptian people